The Women's 50 Freestyle at the 10th FINA World Swimming Championships (25m) took place 18–19 December 2010 in Dubai, United Arab Emirates. The heats and semifinals were swum 18 December; the final on 19 December.

101 individuals swam this event.

Records
Prior to the competition, the existing world and championship records were as follows.

No new world or competition records were set during this competition.

Results

Heats

Semifinals
Semifinal 1

Semifinal 2

Final

References

Freestyle 0050 metre, women's
World Short Course Swimming Championships
2010 in women's swimming